Eva is a 2011 science fiction film directed by Kike Maíllo. It had its world premiere on 7 September 2011 at the 68th Venice International Film Festival, where it was screened out of competition. The film stars Daniel Brühl, Marta Etura, Lluís Homar and Alberto Ammann.

Eva was nominated in twelve categories at the 26th Goya Awards, scoring three wins—Best New Director, Best Supporting Actor and Best Special Effects. It earned nominations for Best Actor, Best Cinematography, Best Editing, Best Make Up and Hairstyles, Best Original Score, Best Original Screenplay, Best Production Design, Best Production Supervision and Best Sound. The film was also nominated for sixteen Gaudí Awards, winning five.

The film had a limited theatrical release in the United States on 13 March 2015 by The Weinstein Company.

Plot

The film is set in 2043, in the time when humans live along with machines. Álex (Daniel Brühl), a renowned cybernetic engineer, returns to his hometown of Santa Irene after a ten-year absence on the behest of the Robotic Faculty, led by Julia (Anne Canovas), his old mentor. Julia has commissioned him to finish the SI-9, a robot built to resemble a child—a project that Álex abandoned prematurely after working on it with Lana (Marta Etura), his old lover, who is now married to David (Alberto Ammann), his brother, both of whom had given up researching to teach.

Álex visits Julia as she lectures students in a robotics laboratory. When a small robotic horse continually fails its tests, the pair of students decide to dismantle it with the phrase "What do you see when you close your eyes?" The robot falls to the ground, and Álex gently admonishes them, telling them that even if they restart the robot, it will never be the same; the phrase "kills" the robot by destroying its emotional memory, and thus, its soul.

Julia and Álex view videos of children, trying to find a suitable child to model the SI-9 off of, but Álex considers them all too ordinary, and they would only make an ordinary robot by proxy. When he returns to his deceased father's house in order to complete his work, he is met by SI-7 robot Max (Lluís Homar), who has been sent to cook and clean for him. Max is startled by Álex's robotic cat and is frustrated when it does not listen to commands; Álex tells him that it is a "free robot," illegal programming that allows it to act as a sentient being. Leaving Max to clean, Álex takes a drive to observe children in order to find a "unique" child to model the SI-9 off of. His attention is caught by the unusual Eva (Claudia Vega), a young girl who notices him and teasingly calls him a pervert when he admits that he was watching her. He asks if she'd like to be the model for his robot, but she refuses.

David presses Álex to visit for dinner, and when Álex arrives, he is surprised to discover that Eva is actually Lana's child and his niece. Eva later visits Álex at his house and assists Álex with modelling the SI-9 through emotional recognition. Álex is amused by her small tantrums and shows her the SI-9 in action. Later that night, as Lana gives Eva a bath, Eva asks her about Álex; Lana tells her that both she and David were hurt and saddened when Álex left abruptly in the middle of the SI-9 project. Eva asks if she loved Álex like David, and Lana replies that she did, "more or less."

Álex asks Julia if the SI-9 project should be modeled after a girl and not a boy, though Julia warns against the negative emotional side-effects of the change. Álex also meets with Lana, who says that she does not want Eva to be in Álex's project. Later, David invites Álex to the upcoming graduation party, and implies that he knows that Lana was Álex's first love and that he suspects lingering feelings between the two. Álex goes ice-skating with Eva, and she leads him up a cliff to look out at the city before pointing out her own house; she tells him that David and Lana do not live together. Álex, however, realizes that she is lying when he goes to visit Lana and David returns home. He asks Eva why she lied, and she tells him that it was because it was what he wanted to hear.

While experimenting with it, the SI-9 becomes hostile to Álex after he laughs at it in the same way Eva became upset. The SI-9 refuses to obey Álex's commands, and when it throws a chisel at him in a fury after he refuses to let it leave, he says the kill phrase and it "dies," along with all of his work on it, frustrating him. He later goes to the graduation party, where Lana and David are waiting; he slow dances with Lana, much to the annoyance of David, who leaves. Lana takes Álex with her to look for him, but when Álex impulsively kisses her, she leaves, disturbed. David, who had seen the kiss, attacks Álex and tells him that he already abandoned Lana once, and that he should go.

A disappointed Álex tells Julia that he is going to quit the project, and she accuses him of leaving another project half-finished. He also visits Eva to tell her that he is leaving, upsetting her. As he packs his things together back at his house, Álex is visited by Lana, who tells him that she does not want him to leave; they kiss, and after Eva approaches to see them through the lab's glass roof, Eva sees Lana tell him that Eva "looks like us because we both made her." Disturbed, Eva runs off. Lana pursues her, but tells Álex to wait back at the house for her to return.

Lana finds Eva unconscious in the snow and opens up a panel in her back, revealing Eva to not be her and Álex's child but a robot, and the product of their research on the SI-9 (literally made by them). She replaces a vial of fluid into Eva's back and Eva regains consciousness, but Eva is frightened and hostile; when Lana tries to grab her, Eva pushes her, and Lana falls off the side of the cliff. Eva returns to Álex's house alone and faints into his arms when he answers the door. At night, Álex gets a call from David that Lana is in the hospital, and he and Eva drive over, arriving just minutes before Lana dies.

Eva tells Max in private that she pushed Lana, and Max relays this to Álex. Julia visits Álex and tells him that Lana finished the SI-9 project after he left, but Eva could not pass the security test and thus wasn't considered safe enough to use; despite this, Lana insisted on keeping Eva, and Julia allowed it. Julia tells Álex that Eva cannot continue to live, and though Álex insists that she's only a girl, Julia reminds him that she killed Lana. Julia offers to "kill" Eva, but Álex tells her that he will do it.

Álex watches Eva skate one last time with Max, and he and David embrace in the shared loss of Lana. That night, Álex takes Eva to his room, preparing to dismantle her; Eva asks Álex to make sure that she doesn't do anything "evil" again, but quickly realizes that he can't fix her. Álex holds the frightened Eva tightly before saying the kill phrase, which ends her programming immediately. Álex looks on at the dead Eva with tears as the camera pans back, showing the "bulbs" of Eva's emotional memory shattering. The film ends with Eva narrating her dying dream—what she "sees," in response to the kill phrase: playing on a beach forever, with Álex and Lana.

Cast
 Daniel Brühl as Álex, the robot engineer.
 Marta Etura as Lana, a former lover of Álex.
 Lluís Homar as Max, robotic butler.
 Alberto Ammann as David, Álex's brother and Lana's lover.
 Claudia Vega as Eva, Lana's child.
 Anne Canovas as Julia, head of the robotics program.

Shooting

Atmosphere
The film combines computer generated imagery of robots and engineering devices and retro clothing and props like a Saab 900 car.

Locations

The film was shot in the province of Barcelona (interior scenes); Panticosa in Huesca; La Chaux-de-Fonds, Switzerland; and Tenerife (the final scene).

Release
Eva was first screened out of competition at the 68th Venice International Film Festival, on 7 September 2011. Subsequently, it opened the Sitges Film Festival on 6 October 2011. The film had its theatrical release in Spain on 28 October. On 4 January 2012, Eva was released in Russia. It also had its French premiere at the Angers European First Film Festival on 24 January. On 27 January, the film was screened at the Gérardmer Film Festival, where it won the Audience Award. EVA will be shown at the Festival of Iberian and Latin American Cinema in Villeurbanne, after which it will be released in French cinemas. On March 13, 2015 the film was released in select theaters in the United States courtesy of The Weinstein Company.

Reception

Critical response
Eva received generally positive reviews from film critics. Miguel Juan Payán of the Acción Cine described the film as a "brave science fiction exercise", and compared it to classics such as Frankenstein, Metropolis, Blade Runner and A.I. Artificial Intelligence. He awarded the film with five out of five points, and especially praised the performances of the cast members. Ignacio Lasierra of the Cine para leer also reviewed the film positively, calling it a "strong and beautiful film with robots." The website Critics Cinema gave Eva 4.5 out of five stars and described it as "an intelligent film that, aparts from notable effects, also offers interesting and emotional stories."

However, Olivier Bachelard of the French web site Abus de ciné felt the "tension build gradually, but without reaching the summit, [...] It remains politically correct, generates little suspense and remains in the area of the nice picture. [...] We would have seen a real thriller. They preferred to give us a little sci–fi targeting families." Carlos Fernández Castro of the Spanish blog Bandeja de Plata gave the film 4.5 points out of five, praising Claudia Vega's portrayal of Eva. In contrast to that, he named the performance of Daniel Brühl as "odd since the moment he had appeared in the film," and the character of Marta Etura as "shallow."

Awards and nominations

See also 
 List of Spanish films of 2011

References

External links
 
 "¿Qué ves cuando cierras los ojos?" (Spanish) - article related to the film

2010s science fiction drama films
2011 films
2010s Catalan-language films
Films featuring a Best Supporting Actor Goya Award-winning performance
Films shot in the Canary Islands
Films shot in Switzerland
French science fiction drama films
Robot films
2010s Spanish-language films
Spanish science fiction drama films
2011 drama films
Films shot in the province of Huesca
2010s Spanish films
2010s French films